The Southend East by-election of 13 March 1980 was held after the death of Conservative Member of Parliament (MP) Stephen McAdden on 26 December 1979. The seat was narrowly held by the Tories in the by-election.

Results

References

Southend East by-election
Politics of Southend-on-Sea
Southend East by-election
Southend East by-election
By-elections to the Parliament of the United Kingdom in Essex constituencies
1980s in Essex